Big Hero 6: The Series is an American superhero animated television series that aired between November 20, 2017, and February 15, 2021. The series was produced by Disney Television Animation and was created by Mark McCorkle and Bob Schooley, also known for co-creating Buzz Lightyear of Star Command and Kim Possible. The show is based on Disney's 2014 film Big Hero 6, which itself is loosely based on the comic book series of the same name published by Marvel Comics. The series acts as a follow-up to the original film and uses traditional hand-drawn animation. 

It premiered with a 43-minute episode titled "Baymax Returns" on Disney XD on November 20, 2017. In 2018, the series was moved from Disney XD to Disney Channel before the series premiere. The series formally premiered with two new episodes on Disney Channel on June 9, 2018.

The second season premiered on May 6, 2019, with a third season confirmed prior. The third season premiered on September 21, 2020, on Disney XD. The third season features predominantly 11-minute episodes, as opposed to the 22-minute episodes of the first two seasons. Cast members stated on January 28, 2021, that the series would not return for a fourth season and the series finale aired on February 15, 2021.

In December 2020, Disney announced a spinoff series titled Baymax! and produced by Walt Disney Animation Studios. The series was released on Disney+ on June 29, 2022.

Plot
The series is set after the events of Big Hero 6 (2014) and continues the adventures of 14-year-old tech genius Hiro Hamada and his compassionate, cutting-edge robot Baymax, created by his late brother Tadashi. Along with his friends Wasabi, Honey Lemon, Go Go and Fred, they form the superhero team Big Hero 6 and embark on high-tech adventures as they protect their city from an array of scientifically enhanced villains. Hiro also faces academic challenges and social trials as the new prodigy at San Fransokyo Institute of Technology (SFIT).

The show slightly contradicts the ending of the original film. Among the differences are Aunt Cass knowing about Baymax, and Hiro attending SFIT as if everything is back to normal (and though a building is erected after Tadashi, Hiro does not receive a grant from the institute). Hiro also does not come up with the name "Big Hero 6" like it is implied at the end of the movie. Instead, Fred comes up with the name after having "brainstormed an epic list of team names" and testing them with himself.

Voice cast and characters

Ryan Potter as Hiro Hamada, a 14-year-old robotics prodigy whose older brother Tadashi Hamada was killed in an explosion at the San Fransokyo Institute of Technology (SFIT) and member of Big Hero 6; he serves as the team's unofficial leader. He wears a suit for protection and to hide his identity when he flies on Baymax.
Scott Adsit as Baymax, an inflatable robot originally built by Tadashi as a medical assistant, but reprogrammed by Hiro to also use martial arts as a member of Big Hero 6; he wears a suit of armor with a jetpack and wings.
Jamie Chung as Go Go Tomago, a tough, athletic student at SFIT and member of Big Hero 6 who specializes in electromagnetics; she uses two large discs as wheels/skates when in action, and also uses smaller discs as weapons.
Genesis Rodriguez as Honey Lemon, a bubbly and optimistic student at SFIT (and Part-Time Student at SFAI or San Fransokyo Art Institute), chemistry enthusiast, and member of Big Hero 6; she uses 'chem-balls' that produce a variety of effects.
Khary Payton as Wasabi, a smart, slightly neurotic student at SFIT and member of Big Hero 6 who specializes in lasers, and has two laser-like blades on his arms when in action. He appreciates order and control in his life and work environment. Wasabi was previously voiced by Damon Wayans Jr. in the film.
Brooks Wheelan as Fred, a comic book fan and slacker who is also team mascot at SFIT and member of Big Hero 6, with reptilian super-suits (one gives the appearance of a lizard-like monster, the other is chameleon-like); he lives in a large mansion. Fred was previously voiced by T.J. Miller in the film.
Maya Rudolph as Aunt Cass, Hiro and Tadashi's aunt and guardian. She is obsessed with cooking new and strange dishes and is oblivious to Hiro's double life, as Hiro knows that she will “never let him out of the house” if he reveals this information.
David Shaughnessy as Heathcliff, Fred's family butler, who assists the team in their training efforts.
Alan Tudyk as Alistair Krei, a pioneer entrepreneur and CEO of Krei Tech. He is revealed to know Big Hero 6's secret identities after they saved his life in the film.

Development and production
In March 2016, Disney announced that a Big Hero 6 television series was in development and premiered on Disney Channel in 2017. The series takes place immediately after the events of the film and is created by Kim Possible'''s Mark McCorkle and Bob Schooley, and executive produced by McCorkle, Schooley and Nick Filippi. The show was reportedly pitched by McCorkle and Schooley shortly following the film's release. Talking to Leonard Maltin for the podcast Maltin on Movies, Scott Adsit suggested an early 2018 release date.

In March 2016, it was revealed that Jamie Chung would reprise her role as Go Go, and that following November, it was revealed that most of the cast members from the film would reprise their roles, including Ryan Potter, Genesis Rodriguez, Scott Adsit, Alan Tudyk, and Maya Rudolph. Additionally, Khary Payton replaced Damon Wayans Jr. as Wasabi and Brooks Wheelan replaced T. J. Miller as Fred. On January 6, 2017, Disney Channel released an official teaser trailer for the series.

On March 14, 2017, it was renewed for a second season, ahead of the series premiere. On April 16, 2019, the series was renewed for a third season. On January 28, 2021, members of the cast stated that the show would not be picked up for a fourth season and would air its final episode on February 15, 2021.

Episodes

BroadcastBaymax Returns premiered on Disney Channel channels in Canada on November 20, 2017, and in the UK and Ireland on November 30, 2017.

The series formally premiered with two new episodes on Disney Channel on June 9, 2018, followed by two more new episodes on June 10, 2018, with weekly premieres every Saturday through September starting on June 16, 2018, with episodes airing at 7 a.m. starting on September 8.

Starting on May 6, episodes of the second season aired on weekdays at 3:30 p.m. Starting on September 3, 2019, first-run premieres aired on Disney XD weekdays at 7:30 a.m. Premieres on Disney Channel aired second-run weekdays at 3:30 p.m. Eventually, the series officially moved premieres back to Disney XD starting on January 4, 2020, until the series finale.

The series is also available on Disney's streaming service, Disney+.

Home media

Awards and nominations

Comic book series
A comic book series based on Big Hero 6: The Series'' was announced to be published by IDW Publishing, making it one of the few times Marvel Comics has allowed another comic book company use their characters. The comic book series was initially titled after the film and set to be released in July 2018 from Hannah Blumenreich (writer) and Nicoletta Baldari (artist). However, the release kept getting pushed back. Since then, the comic has been retitled after the show and was released on November 13, 2019 with Blumenreich and Baldari still attached. Its follow up issues would not get released until close to a year later.

A manga series by Yen Press was released in August 2021 and is written and illustrated by Hong Gyun An. The first volume adapts the episodes "Issue 188", "Failure Mode" and "Baymax Returns Part 1", but has it feel more connected and linear.

Notes

References

External links

2010s American animated television series
2010s American comic science fiction television series
2010s American superhero comedy television series
2010s American teen drama television series
2017 American television series debuts
2021 American television series endings
2020s American animated television series
2020s American comic science fiction television series
2020s American superhero comedy television series
2020s American teen drama television series
American children's animated action television series
American children's animated comic science fiction television series
American children's animated science fantasy television series
American children's animated drama television series
American children's animated superhero television series
American sequel television series
Animated television series about robots
Animated television series based on Marvel Comics
Animated television shows based on films
Anime-influenced Western animated television series
Annie Award winners
TV series
Disney Channel original programming
Nanotechnology in fiction
Teen animated television series
Teen superhero television series
Television series based on adaptations
Television series based on Disney films
Television series by Disney Television Animation
Television series created by Bob Schooley and Mark McCorkle
Television shows based on Marvel Comics
English-language television shows